

This is a list of the National Register of Historic Places listings in Cherokee County, Iowa.

This is intended to be a complete list of the properties on the National Register of Historic Places in Cherokee County, Iowa, United States. Latitude and longitude coordinates are provided for many National Register properties and districts; these locations may be seen together in a map.

There are 12 properties and districts listed on the National Register in the county, including one National Historic Landmark.

Current listings

|}

See also

 List of National Historic Landmarks in Iowa
 National Register of Historic Places listings in Iowa

References

Cherokee